Sandy Ridge is an unincorporated community in Stokes County, North Carolina, United States, approximately  northeast of county seat Danbury, on North Carolina State Highway 704. Sandy Ridge is 18 miles from Walnut Cove via NC Highway 704 South, NC 772 south, and US 311. It is 8.7 miles from Lawsonville via NC 704. It is 4 miles from the state line with Virginia

Unincorporated communities in Stokes County, North Carolina
Unincorporated communities in North Carolina